Chathanthara is a small village in Vechoochira panchayath of Ranni taluk, Kerala state, India. Local Landmark Perunthenaruvi Falls is just 1.5 km from the village.

References 

Villages in Pathanamthitta district